Romina Biagioli (born 3 April 1989) is an Argentine triathlete. She competed in the women's event at the 2020 Summer Olympics held in Tokyo, Japan.

Career 
She finished in 9th place in the women's triathlon at the 2019 Pan American Games held in Lima, Peru. She also competed in the mixed relay event.

Her sister is swimmer Cecilia Biagioli.

References

External links
 

1989 births
Living people
Argentine female triathletes
Pan American Games competitors for Argentina
Triathletes at the 2011 Pan American Games
Triathletes at the 2015 Pan American Games
Triathletes at the 2019 Pan American Games
Olympic triathletes of Argentina
Triathletes at the 2020 Summer Olympics
Sportspeople from Córdoba, Argentina
20th-century Argentine women
21st-century Argentine women